The MV Yorkshire Belle is a pleasure cruiser based in Bridlington, East Riding of Yorkshire, England. She was built by Cook, Welton & Gemmell as a replacement for the original Yorkshire Belle, that was lost in the River Humber during the Second World War after hitting a magnetic mine, sinking with all hands.

Summary
With two eight-cylinder Gardner engines each giving 152 hp she can carry up to 198 passengers. The ship was fitted out with her diesel engines in 1951 and is the last of six pleasure boats from Bridlington that operated between the 1920s and the 1950s.

She is fully licensed with a lounge bar and is equipped with a public commentary system for pleasure cruises and sightseeing tours along Flamborough Head and the Yorkshire coast. As well as cruises to Flamborough Head, there are also special extended cruises to the Bempton Cliffs RSPB reserve offering close-up views of the cliffs, lighthouse and caves.

She was bought in 1982 by her current owner Mr Peter Richardson, who complained in 2007 about the UK's implementation of EU law restricting the Yorkshire Belle from sailing to Scarborough from Bridlington. Richardson stated that the ship had regularly sailed between the two Yorkshire ports for the a period of 15 years up until the ruling.

Awards
In 2008, she won Winner of The Sunday Times Best Boat Trip in Britain and was highly commended in the Remarkable East Yorkshire Tourism Awards for 2017.

References

Passenger ships of England
1947 ships
Bridlington